Francism refers to Mouvement Franciste.

Francism may also refer to:

 FrancisM, an alias of Filipino rapper Francis Magalona

See also:
 Francoism, Spain under Francisco Franco
 Gallicism, a word borrowed from French into another language; this is sometimes called francism